is a Japanese sprinter. He competed in the men's 100 metres at the 1992 Summer Olympics.

References

External links
 

1970 births
Living people
Athletes (track and field) at the 1992 Summer Olympics
Japanese male sprinters
Olympic athletes of Japan
Universiade medalists in athletics (track and field)
Place of birth missing (living people)
Universiade silver medalists for Japan
Medalists at the 1993 Summer Universiade
20th-century Japanese people